Hobyo, is an ancient port city in Galmudug state in the north-central Mudug region of Somalia.

Hobyo was founded as a coastal outpost by the Ajuran Empire during the 13th century. In the late 17th century the Hiraab successfully revolted against the Ajuran Sultanate who had been ruling Hobyo since the 13th century and established an independent Hiraab Imamate. According to Bernhard Helander of Uppsala University, "the Imam of Hawiye is a hereditary position that traditionally is held by a person of the first-born branch."

History

Ajuuran Empire and Hiraab Imamate period
Along with Mareeg, Hobyo developed as a coastal outpost by the Ajuran Empire during the 13th century.

However, in the late 17th century the Hiraab successfully revolted against the Ajuran Sultanate and established an independent Hiraab Imamate According to Bernhard Helander of Uppsala University, "the Imam of Hiraab is a hereditary position that traditionally is held by a person of the first-born branch."

Lee Cassanelli in his book The Shaping of Somali society provides a historical picture of the Hiraab Immate. He writes:

"According to local oral tradition, the Hiraab imamate was a powerful alliance of closely related groups who shared a common lineage under the Gorgaarte clan divisions. It successfully revolted against the Ajuran Sultanate and established an independent rule for at least two centuries from the seventeen hundreds and onwards.

The alliance involved the army leaders and advisors of the Habar Gidir and Duduble, a Fiqhi/Qadi of Sheekhaal, and the Imam was reserved for the Mudulood branch who is believed to have been the first born. Once established, the Imamate ruled the territories from the Shabeelle valley, the Benaadir provinces,  the Mareeg areas all the way to the arid lands of Mudug.

The agricultural centres of Eldher and Harardhere included the production of sorghum and beans, supplementing with herds of camels, cattle, goats and sheep. Livestock, hides and skin, whilst the aromatic woods and raisins were the primary exports as rice, other foodstuffs and clothes were imported. Merchants looking for exotic goods came to Hobyo to buy textiles, precious metals and pearls.  The commercial goods harvested along the Shabelle river were brought to Hobyo for trade. Also, the increasing importance and rapid settlement of more southerly cities such as Mogadishu further boosted the prosperity of Hobyo, as more and more ships made their way down the Somali coast and stopped in Hobyo to trade and replenish their supplies.

The last Sultan of Hobyo was Sultan Ducaale Kahiye who managed to send Kenadiid who was working with the Italians to exile.

Climate
Hobyo has a hot arid climate (Köppen BWh).

Demographics
Hobyo has a population of around 11,800 inhabitants. The broader Hobyo District has a total population of 67,249 residents.

Transportation
Hobyo has a seaport which serves the town.

For air transportation, the city is served by the Obbia Airport.

In August 2019, Qatar initiated a project to build the port of Hobyo as part of the development agreements signed between Somalia and Qatar in December 2018.

See also
Piracy off the coast of Somalia
Essina
Nikon
Damo, Somalia
Gondershe
Sarapion
Opone
Malao
Mosylon

References

Bibliography

External links
Hobyo, Somalia

Populated places in Mudug
Galmudug
Ajuran Sultanate
Populated coastal places in Somalia